Duality may refer to:

Mathematics
 Duality (mathematics), a mathematical concept
 Dual (category theory), a formalization of mathematical duality
 Duality (optimization)
 Duality (order theory), a concept regarding binary relations
 Duality (projective geometry), general principle of projective geometry
 Duality principle (Boolean algebra), the extension of order-theoretic duality to Boolean algebras
 S-duality (homotopy theory)

Philosophy, logic, and psychology
 Dualistic cosmology, a twofold division in several spiritual and religious worldviews
 Dualism (philosophy of mind), where the body and mind are considered to be irreducibly distinct
 De Morgan's laws, specifically the ability to generate the dual of any logical expression
 Complementary duality of Carl Jung's functions and types in Socionics

Science

Electrical and mechanical
 Duality (electrical circuits), regarding isomorphism of electrical circuits
 Duality (mechanical engineering), regarding isomorphism of some mechanical laws

Physics
 AdS/CFT correspondence (anti de Sitter/conformal field theory correspondence), sometimes called the Maldacena duality
 Dual resonance model
 Duality (electricity and magnetism)
 Englert–Greenberger duality relation
 Holographic duality
 Kramers–Wannier duality
 
 Mirror symmetry (string theory)
 Montonen–Olive duality
 Mysterious duality
 String duality,  a class of symmetries
 S-duality
 T-duality
 U-duality
 Wave–particle duality

Music

Albums
 Duality (Peter Leitch and John Hicks album), 1994
 Duality (Lisa Gerrard and Pieter Bourke album), 1998
 Duality (Set It Off album), 2014
 Duality (Ra album), 2005
 Duality (mixtape), 2012
 Duality (Luna Li album), 2022
 Duality, a 2009 album by Darker Half
 Duality, a 2020 album by Duke Dumont
 Duality, a 2018 album by Big Scoob

Songs
 "Duality", a 2014 single from pop rock/punk rock band Set It Off
 "Duality" (song), a 2004 single & Grammy-nominated song by metal band Slipknot
 "Duality", a 2007 single from alternative rock/punk band Bayside

Other
 Duality (film), a 2001 Star Wars fan film by Dave Macomber and Mark Thomas
 Duality, a large format audio mixing console by Solid State Logic
 Duality (CoPs), refers to the notion of a duality in a Community of Practice
 Dual (grammatical number), grammatical number that some languages use in addition to singular and plural

See also 
 Double (disambiguation)
 Dual (disambiguation)
 Duality principle (disambiguation)
 List of dualities: philosophy, mathematics, physics and engineering
 Nondualism (philosophy)
 Triality (mathematics)